Crewe and Nantwich is a constituency in the House of Commons of the UK Parliament. It is located in Cheshire. It was created in 1983, and has been represented since 2019 by Kieran Mullan of the Conservative Party.

Constituency profile
The constituency was created for the 1983 general election following the major reorganisation of local authorities under the Local Government Act 1972, which came into effect on 1 April 1974. It combined parts of the abolished separate constituencies of Crewe and Nantwich and reunited the towns of Crewe and Nantwich in one constituency.  

The seat is marginal as Crewe tends to vote Labour, and Nantwich and the surrounding Cheshire villages are more Conservative-inclined. Its residents are slightly poorer than the UK average.

Boundaries

1983–1997: The Borough of Crewe and Nantwich wards of Acton, Alexandra, Audlem, Barony Weaver, Bunbury, Combermere, Coppenhall, Delamere, Grosvenor, Maw Green, Minshull, Peckforton, Queens Park, Ruskin Park, St Barnabas, St John's, Shavington, Waldron, Wellington, Weston Park, Willaston East, Willaston West, Wistaston, Wrenbury, and Wybunbury

Comprised the former Municipal Borough of Crewe, previously making up about half of the abolished constituency of Crewe, together with Nantwich and remaining parts of the new Borough of Crewe and Nantwich (excluding Haslington), previously in the abolished constituency of Nantwich

1997–2010: The Borough of Crewe and Nantwich wards of Alexandra, Barony Weaver, Coppenhall, Delamere, Grosvenor, Haslington, Maw Green, Queens Park, Ruskin Park, St Barnabas, St John's, Shavington, Waldron, Wellington, Weston Park, Willaston East, Willaston West, Wistaston, and Wybunbury

The rural wards of Acton, Audlem, Bunbury, Combermere, Minshull, Peckforton, and Wrenbury were transferred to Eddisbury. To compensate for this loss, Haslington was transferred from Congleton

2010–present: The Parliamentary Constituencies (England) Order 2007 defined the boundaries as:
The Borough of Crewe and Nantwich wards of Alexandra, Barony Weaver, Birchin, Coppenhall, Delamere, Englesea, Grosvenor, Haslington, Leighton, Maw Green, St Barnabas, St John's, St Mary's, Shavington, Valley, Waldron, Wellington, Wells Green, Willaston, Wistaston Green, and Wybunbury

Minor changes due to revision of ward boundaries

However, before this came into force for the 2010 election, the Borough of Crewe and Nantwich was abolished on 1 April 2009, becoming part of the new unitary authority of Cheshire East. Consequently, the constituency's boundaries are currently:

The Cheshire East Borough wards of Crewe Central, Crewe East, Crewe North, Crewe St Barnabas, Crewe South, Crewe West, Haslington, Leighton (part), Nantwich North & West, Nantwich South & Stapeley, Shavington, Willaston & Rope, Wistaston, and Wybunbury

Political history
The seat had been a marginal seat since 2008, as its winner's majority had not exceeded 11.8% of the vote since the 18.9% majority won in that year. A swing seat, it has changed hands twice since 2008. Its 2017 general election result was the eighth-closest result, a winning margin of 48 votes. In 2019, the Conservative candidate secured a 15.7% majority.

On its formation for the 1983 general election, the Labour MP Gwyneth Dunwoody, who had served for the previous constituency of Crewe, came close to losing her second seat in 1983 (she had earlier lost her Exeter seat in 1970), when she scraped in by just 290 votes. Dunwoody increased her majorities at the general elections of 1987, 1992 and 1997. Her majority was slightly reduced at the 2001 and 2005 general elections. She died on 17 April 2008, after 34 years representing the seat and its predecessor, leading to a by-election held on 22 May 2008 which was won by the Conservative candidate Edward Timpson. The Labour candidate, Dunwoody's daughter Tamsin, came a distant second. Having previously enjoyed a considerable lead in support over the Conservatives (as indicated in Gwyneth Dunwoody's over 7,000 majority in 2005), the Labour government had lost support due to the onset of the global recession and Gordon Brown’s relatively weak image as a leader.

The by-election produced the first Conservative MP for the seat and nationally the first gain for a Conservative Party candidate at a parliamentary by-election since the Mitcham and Morden by-election in 1982 during the Falklands War, and the first from Labour since the Ilford North by-election of 1978.

Timpson held the seat until 2017, where Labour's Laura Smith gained it with a narrow majority of just 48 votes, the closest margin in the seat's history and the second-narrowest Labour gain of the election (behind Kensington, at 20 votes). In the 2019 General Election the Conservatives regained the seat with a majority of 8,508 on a swing of 7.9% to the Conservatives, with Kieran Mullan becoming the new MP. Edward Timpson became the Conservatives' 2019 candidate for Eddisbury, replacing Antoinette Sandbach, who lost the whip earlier that year due to her opposition to a no-deal Brexit; Timpson regained the seat for the Conservatives.

Members of Parliament

Elections

Elections in the 2010s

Elections in the 2000s

Elections in the 1990s

Elections in the 1980s

See also 

 List of parliamentary constituencies in Cheshire
History of parliamentary constituencies and boundaries in Cheshire

References

Parliamentary constituencies in Cheshire
Constituencies of the Parliament of the United Kingdom established in 1983
Crewe
Nantwich